USS Samuel B. Roberts (DE-413) was a  destroyer escort of the United States Navy that served in World War II , the first of three U.S. Navy ships to bear the name.

Samuel B. Roberts was named after Coxswain Samuel Booker Roberts, Jr., a Navy Cross recipient, who had been commended for voluntarily steering a Higgins boat towards enemy forces at Guadalcanal, in order to divert fire from evacuation efforts being undertaken by other friendly vessels. She was nicknamed the "Sammy B" or "Sam Buca" (after the popular Italian spirit).

Samuel B. Roberts was sunk in the Battle off Samar, in which a small force of U.S. warships prevented a superior Imperial Japanese Navy force from attacking the amphibious invasion fleet off the Philippine island of Leyte. The ship was part of a relatively light flotilla of destroyers, destroyer escorts, and escort carriers called "Taffy 3" which was inadvertently left to fend off a fleet of heavily armed Japanese battleships, cruisers, and destroyers off the island of Samar during the Battle off Samar, one of the engagements making up the larger Battle of Leyte Gulf of October 1944.

Steaming through incoming shells, Samuel B. Roberts scored one torpedo hit and several shell hits on larger enemy warships before she was sunk. After the battle, Samuel B. Roberts received the appellation "the destroyer escort that fought like a battleship." As of June 2022, she is the deepest shipwreck discovered. Her last known survivor died on 20 March 2022.

Construction and commissioning

Samuel B. Roberts was laid down on 6 December 1943, by the Brown Shipbuilding Company of Houston, Texas. She was launched on 20 January 1944, sponsored by the namesake's mother, Mrs. Anna Roberts. She was commissioned on 28 April 1944, commanded by Lieutenant Commander Robert W. Copeland, USNR

Service history
Samuel B. Roberts had a shakedown cruise off Bermuda from 21 May to 19 June 1944. After spending time at the Boston Navy Yard, Roberts departed for Norfolk, Virginia, on 7 July. Later that day, the ship presumably struck a whale, which bent her starboard propeller. Repairs were completed by 11 July. Roberts departed Norfolk on 22 July, going through the Panama Canal on 27 July. She joined the Pacific Fleet at Pearl Harbor on 10 August.

She conducted training exercises around the Hawaiian Islands then steamed out on 21 August with a convoy reaching Eniwetok Atoll on 30 August. On 2 September, Roberts returned to Pearl Harbor, with a convoy arriving on 10 September. Following further training, the destroyer escort got underway on 21 September, escorted a convoy to Eniwetok, and arrived on 30 September.

Roberts next proceeded to Manus Island in the Admiralty Islands of the Southwest Pacific and then joined Task Unit 77.4.3, nicknamed "Taffy 3". From there she steamed to Leyte Gulf area off the eastern Philippines. On arrival, she commenced operations with the Northern Air Support Group off the Island of Samar.

Battle off Samar

Shortly after dawn on 25 October, Samuel B. Roberts was protecting Taffy 3's escort carriers whose aircraft were supporting the Army assault. The warships were steaming off the eastern coast of Samar when the Japanese Center Force, a 23-ship task force under the command of Vice Admiral Takeo Kurita, appeared on the horizon and opened fire. At 07:35, Roberts turned and headed toward the heavy cruiser .

The commanding officer, Copeland, announced "We're making a torpedo run. The outcome is doubtful, but we will do our duty." With smoke as cover, Roberts steamed to within  of Chōkai, coming under fire from the cruiser's forward  guns.

Roberts had moved so close that the enemy guns could not depress enough to hit her and when in torpedo range, Roberts launched three Mark 15 torpedoes, with one blowing off Chōkais stern. Roberts fought with the Japanese ships for a further hour, firing more than six hundred  shells, and while maneuvering at very close range, hitting Chōkais superstructure with her 40 mm and 20 mm anti-aircraft guns.

At 08:51, the Japanese landed two hits, the second of which damaged the aft  gun. This damaged gun suffered a breech explosion shortly thereafter which killed and wounded several crew members. With her remaining  gun, Roberts set the bridge of the heavy cruiser  on fire and destroyed the Number Three gun turret.

At 09:35, the order was given to abandon ship. She sank 30 minutes later, with 90 of the crew dying. The 120 survivors of the crew clung to three life rafts for 50 hours before being rescued.

Samuel B. Roberts was stricken from the Naval Vessel Register on 27 November 1944.

Awards and honors

Samuel B. Roberts was included in the Presidential Unit Citation given to Task Unit 77.4.3 "for extraordinary heroism in action." Samuel B. Roberts earned one battle star for her World War II service.

Gunner's Mate Third Class Paul H. Carr was in charge of Gun Mount 52, the aft  gun, which had fired nearly all of its 325 stored rounds in 35 minutes before a round exploded in the gun's breech. Carr was found dying at his station from a severe intestinal wound, begging for help to load the last round he was holding into the breech. For his actions, he was posthumously awarded a Silver Star. A guided-missile frigate, USS  (FFG-52), was named for him.

The frigate  was named for the ship's commanding officer.

Memorials
 At the U.S. Naval Academy, in Alumni Hall, a concourse is dedicated to Lieutenant Lloyd Garnett and his shipmates on Samuel B. Roberts who earned their ship the reputation as the "destroyer escort that fought like a battleship" in the Battle of Leyte Gulf.

Successors
Two later U.S. warships have borne the name USS Samuel B. Roberts:

 The third , is an  guided missile frigate, commissioned in 1986 and decommissioned on 22 May 2015.

Discovery of wreck
An exploration team led by Victor Vescovo and made up of personnel of Caladan Oceanic, Deep Ocean Search  and EYOS Expeditions discovered the wreck of Samuel B. Roberts in June 2022. The team found, identified, and surveyed the wreck during a series of six dives conducted from 17 to 24 June 2022.

The team reported that it had found evidence of damage to the ship inflicted by a Japanese battleship shell, including Samuel B. Robertss fallen mast.

The USS Samuel B. Roberts has been detected using world's first "full ocean depth" side scan sonar (rated for 11000m), integrated by Deep Ocean Search company and Caladan Oceanic sub-team on submersible Limiting Factor.

Sunken ship protection
The wreck of Samuel B. Roberts is protected from unauthorized disturbance by the Sunken Military Craft Act. A permit for archaeological, historical, or educational purposes can be requested from the Naval History and Heritage Command.

Notes

References

Further reading 

 
 
 
 
 
  based on Hornfischer's The Last Stand of the Tin Can Sailors.

External links

Captain Copeland's memoirs
DE 413 timeline
The Samuel B. Roberts Survivors Association

1944 ships
John C. Butler-class destroyer escorts
Maritime incidents in October 1944
Ships built in Houston
World War II frigates and destroyer escorts of the United States
World War II shipwrecks in the Philippine Sea
Shipwrecks of the Philippines